Fred Manson is an urban renewal specialist from the United Kingdom. He is the former Director of Regeneration at the London borough of Southwark.

Fred Manson was appointed Director of Development in 1990 and Director of Regeneration and Environment in 1994 in the UK. His areas of expertise include economic development, planning, property management, environmental management, regeneration and leisure and community services. He has done some of London's most significant projects, such as Tate Modern, the Millennium Bridge and Greater London Authority headquarters.

References 

British urban planners
Living people
Year of birth missing (living people)